José Luis Dámaso Martinez (born May 14, 1974) is a Spanish international professional basketball coach. He has coached professionally in Spain, Nicaragua and recently in El Salvador with A.D. Isidro Metapán and Quezaltepeque Basketball Club. Currently, he is the head coach of the Liga Municipal Monsenor Romero female team. The team competes out of Santa Ana, El Salvador in La Liga Mayor de Baloncesto Femenino.

He is most known for winning a championship in the ACB League of Nicaragua with Toros del Norte in 2015 and his team's subsequent victory in the FIBA COCABA Championship

He has also served as the head coach of the Guatemalan male and female national teams for the Central American Games and Centrobasket in 2017.

Early life 

Dámaso was born in Valencia, Spain on May 14, 1974.

Coaching career

Spain 

Dámaso began his professional career with Club Deportivo Nazaret (Valencia) first as a player and then as an eventual coach from 1992 - 1997. Afterwards he had a 14-year tenure with Albacete under its various club affiliates (C.A.B.A,  CB Cinco y Albacete Basket).
 
In the 2014 – 2015, Dámaso joined Fundacion Real Madrid before continuing his coaching career in Central America.

In the Spanish coaching ranks, Dámaso is most known for his time spent with Caja Rural de Albacete C.A.B.A – a third division female team competing out of LEB Plata. There, his team won a match 206-20 against CB Villarrobledo – a Spanish national record for margin of victory that stood for many years.

Nicaragua 

In 2015, Dámaso accepted a contract to coach Toros del Norte in the ACB League of Nicaragua. The team finished 15-3 (win-loss) in league play, defeating Leones de Managua in the finals, 4-1. 

With the victory, the team was invited to participate in the FIBA COCABA Championship - where the club prevailed, winning the regional club tournament held in El Salvador that year. Toros del Norte was then invited to compete in The FIBA Americas League - a tournament consisting of the 16 best club teams in the Americas.

In the following 2016 season, Dámaso joined Trini's de La Trinidad (Esteli) of the ACB League of Nicaragua. The team finished first in league-play at 16-5 (win-loss) and qualified for the championship finals. However they were eliminated by third-seeded Tiburones Movistar in the final round, 3-1. 

Despite the loss, Dámaso and Esteli were still invited to participate in the 2016 FIBA COCABA Championship.

El Salvador 

In 2018, Damaso signed a contract with A.D. Isidro Metapan playing out of La Liga Mayor de Baloncesto in El Salvador – becoming the first Spanish coach in league history.

In his first year the club was eliminated 3-1 in the first round of the LMB playoffs against fourth-seeded Brujos de Izalco however in his second season, A.D. Isidro Metapan made its second finals appearance in team history, ultimately losing to Santa Tecla. 

Following the season, Damaso signed with Quezaltepeque Basketball Club.

In 2020 Damaso returned to coaching women's basketball by taking the head coaching position with Liga Municipal Monsenor Romero based out of Santa Ana, El Salvador. The team competes in La Liga Mayor de Baloncesto Femenino.

International career

Guatemala 

In 2017, alongside fellow Spaniard Angel Fernández, Dámaso and Fernández combined to coach the men's and women's Guatemalan national teams for the 2017 Central American Games in Managua, Nicaragua as well as the women's national team for the 2017 Centrobasket in Saint Thomas, U.S. Virgin Islands, respectively.

In that same year the Guatemalan Basketball Federation offered Dámaso full control of both squads for a three-four year development project meant to last beyond the 2020 Summer Olympics in Tokyo, Japan.

References 

Spanish basketball coaches
1974 births
Living people